Espenau is a municipality in the district of Kassel, in Hesse, Germany. It is composed of two districts the Espenau-Hohenkirchen, and the Espenau-Mönchehof both are situated 9 kilometers north of Kassel. As of December 2019, Espenau has 5,158 inhabitants. It covers a total area of 13.59 km².

Geography 
Espenau is bordered by the municipalities of Immenhausen to the north, Fuldatal to the east, Vellmar to the south, and Calden and Grebenstein to the west.

A pond at the northern edge of Hohenkirchen is the source of the Esse river. The Espe river, a tributary of the Fulda, starts in the western portion of Espenau and flows through the town, and gives the town its name.

Espenau is about 6 kilometers from the rococo style Wilhelmsthal Castle.

History 
Hohenkirchen's earliest mention is in a certificate dating back to 1285. In 1216, the Hardehausen Monastery built a farm in the area of Mönchehof, likely given its name in 1500 because of the two monks that operated the farm. As part of a larger series of local government reorganization in Hesse, the villages of Hohenkirchen and Mönchehof were combined into the same municipality of Espenau in October 1970.

Coat of Arms 
The coat of arms depicts four aspen tree leaves against red and white quandrants, a reference to the town's name of Espenau (German: Espe).

Transportation 
Espenau-Mönchehof has a stop on the Kassel–Warburg railway. It is connected by the Kassel RegioTram Line 1 to Kassel Hauptbahnhof. It is also connected via bus to Immenhausen Vellmar, Calden, and the nearby Kassel Airport.

Notable people 
Bernd Herrmann (*1951)- West German athlete who primarily competed in the 400 metres.

References

Kassel (district)